The economy of Gabon is characterized by strong links with France, large foreign investments, dependence on skilled foreign labor, and decline of agriculture. Gabon enjoys a per capita income four times that of most nations of sub-Saharan Africa, its reliance on resource extraction industry releasing much of the population from extreme poverty.

Resources
The country is rich in natural resources such as timber, manganese and oil. The country is the fifth largest oil producing nation in Africa, which has helped drive its strong growth in the later 20th century.

The oil sector now accounts for 50% of GDP and 80% of exports. In 2012 there were six active oil rigs in Gabon.

The government has plans to diversify its economy away from its dwindling oil reserves. The government announced in 2012 that it would reassess exactly how much iron ore the Belinga site contains before awarding the concession to a mining company, most likely to be China's CMEC, which temporarily secured the rights to the ore in 2007.

Around 80% of Gabonese live in cities. The capital city, Libreville is home to 59% of the total population. The remainder of the country is still sparsely populated, as those areas remain densely forested.

Statistics
GDP - composition by sector:
agriculture:
5.7%
industry:
57.2%
services:
37% (2008 est.)

Population below poverty line:
NA%

Household income or consumption by percentage share:
lowest 10%:
NA%
highest 10%:
NA%

Inflation rate (consumer prices):
5% (2008 est.)

Labour force:
592,000 (2008 est.)

Labour force - by occupation:
agriculture 60%, services and government 25%, industry and commerce 15% (2000 est.)

Unemployment rate:
21% (2006 est.)

Budget:
revenues:
$4.46 billion
expenditures:
$2.75 billion (2008 est.)

Industries:
food and beverage; textile; lumbering and plywood; cement; petroleum extraction and refining; manganese, uranium, and gold mining; chemical production; ship repair

Industrial production growth rate:
1.5% (2008)

Oil - production
 (2007 est.)

Oil - consumption
 (2007 est.)

Oil - exports
 (2005 est.)

Oil - imports
 (2005 est.)

Oil - proven reserves
 (1 January 2008 est.)

Natural gas - production
100 million cu m (2006 est.)

Natural gas - consumption
100 million cu m (2006 est.)

Natural gas - exports
0 cu m (2007 est.)

Natural gas - imports
0 cu m (2007 est.)

Natural gas - proven reserves
28.32 billion cu m (1 January 2008 est.)

Electricity - production:
1.671 TWh (2006 est.)

Electricity - production by source:
fossil fuel:
27.8%
hydro:
72.2%
nuclear:
0%
other:
0% (1998)

Electricity - consumption:
1.365 GWh (2006 est.)

Electricity - exports:
0 kWh (2006 est.)

Electricity - imports:
0 kWh (1998)

Agriculture - products:
cocoa, coffee, sugar, palm oil, rubber; cattle; okoume (a tropical hardwood); fish

Current account - balance
$591 million (2010 est.)

Currency:
1 Communauté financière africaine franc (CFAF) = 100 centimes

Exchange rates:
Communauté financière africaine francs (CFAF) per US$1 – 507.71 (2010), 472.19 (2009), 447.81 (2008), 481.83 (2007), 522.89 (2006), 647.25 (January 2000), 615.70 (1999), 589.95 (1998), 583.67 (1997), 511.55 (1996), 499.15 (1995)
note:
since 1 January 1999, the CFAF is pegged to the euro at a rate of 655.957 CFA francs per euro

Statistics table 
The following table shows the main economic indicators in 1980–2017.

See also
Agriculture in Gabon
Economy of Africa
Forestry in Gabon
List of companies based in Gabon
Mining in Gabon
Transport in Gabon
Chronology of Gabon
 United Nations Economic Commission for Africa

References

External links
 
 Gabon latest trade data on ITC Trade Map
 MBendi Gabon overview
 The Quicker Ticker- Gabon (in french)
 Legabon.org
 Gaboneco.com

 
Gabon
Gabon
Gabon